Amoco Junction was a junction on the Pacific Electric Railway's Southern District.  It was located in Nevin, South Central Los Angeles at 25th Street and Long Beach Boulevard.  It was named after a nearby American Olive Company (AmOCo) plant. It was the junction where the Santa Monica Air Line split off from the Watts, Long Beach and other Southern District Lines. It was one of several points at which a tower crossed the quadruple tracks between Downtown Los Angeles and Watts.  Despite being a junction, many lines did not stop at Amoco, which was only served by local cars and the Air Line. Service was provided to Amoco Junction between 1904 and 1958. Though it is located along the route of the Los Angeles Metro A Line, it is not a stop or station on it, nor did it become a station on the Expo Line that replaced the Santa Monica Air Line.

References

Pacific Electric junctions
Neighborhoods in Los Angeles
Railway stations opened in 1904
Railway stations closed in 1958